Amblyseius perditus is a species of mite in the family Phytoseiidae.

References

perditus
Articles created by Qbugbot
Animals described in 1965